Daddy's Coolest (also known as Daddy's Coolest: Volume 1 or Daddy's Coolest: The 20 Greatest Hits of Daddy Cool) is the sixth compilation album by Australian rock band Daddy Cool, released in 1982. The album peaked at number 5 on the Australian Kent Music Report and at number 29 on the Recorded Music NZ albums charts. It includes tracks from Daddy Cool's two studio albums Daddy Who? Daddy Cool and Sex, Dope, Rock'n'Roll: Teenage Heaven. The album was re-released in 1992, which reached number 35 on the ARIA Charts.

Track listing

Chart positions

Certifications and sales

Personnel 
 Ross Wilson— lead vocals, guitar, harmonica 
 Gary Young — drums, vocals 
 Ross Hannaford— lead guitar, bass, vocals 
 Wayne Duncan — bass guitar, vocals 
Production
 Producer – Robie Porter (tracks: 1 to 4, 16 to 20), Ross Wilson (tracks: 15)

References

External links 
 Daddy Cool - Daddy's Coolest at Discogs

Daddy Cool (band) compilation albums
1982 compilation albums
Mega Records albums